Leopold Horace Ognall (20 June 1908 – 12 April 1979), known by the pen names Hartley Howard and Harry Carmichael, was a British crime novelist.  Ognall was born in Montreal and worked as a journalist before starting his fiction career.  He wrote over 90 novels before his death in 1979. The private eye Glenn Bowman was one of his most successful characters.  As Harry Carmichael, Ognall's primary series characters were John Piper (an insurance assessor) and Quinn, a crime reporter.

Ognall's son Sir Harry Ognall became a high court judge and conducted the hearings regarding former Chilean leader Augusto Pinochet.

Bibliography
As Hartley Howard, Ognall authored the following novels (with year of publication):

 The Last Appointment  1951
 The Last Deception  1951
 Death of Cecilia  1952
 The Last Vanity  1951
 Bowman Strikes Again  1953
 The Other Side of the Door  1953
 Bowman at a Venture  1954
 Bowman on Broadway  1954
 No Target for Bowman  1955
 Sleep for the Wicked  1955
 The Bowman Touch  1956
 A Hearse for Cinderella  1956
 Key to the Morgue  1957
 The Long Night  1957
 The Big Snatch  1958
 Sleep, My Pretty One  1958
 The Armitage Secret  1959
 Deadline  1959
 Extortion  1960
 Fall Guy  1960
 I'm No Hero  1961
 Time Bomb  1961
 Count-Down  1962
 Double Finesse  1962
 The Stretton Case  1963
 Department K (US Title: Assignment K.)  1964
 Out of the Fire  1965
 Counterfeit  1966
 Portrait of a Beautiful Harlot  1966
 Routine Investigation  1967
 The Eye of the Hurricane  1968
 The Secret of Simon Cornell  1969
 Cry on My Shoulder  1970
 Room 37  1970
 Million Dollar Snapshot  1971
 Murder One  1971
 Epitaph for Joanna  1972
 Nice Day for a Funeral  1972
 Highway to Murder  1973
 Dead Drunk  1974
 Treble Cross  1975
 Payoff  1976
 One-Way Ticket  1978
 The Sealed Envelope  1979

Harry Carmichael

Ognall created the pseudonym "Harry Carmichael" as an amalgam of the names of his immediate family: His son Harry, his wife Cecilia, his daughter Margaret, and his son Michael.

As Harry Carmichael, Ognall authored the following novels (with year of publication):

 Death Leaves a Diary  1952
 The Vanishing Trick  1952
 Deadly Night-Cap  1953
 School for Murder  1953
 Why Kill Johnny?  1954
 Death Counts Three (US Title: The Screaming Rabbit)  1954
 Money for Murder  1955
 Noose for a Lady  1955
 The Dead of Night  1956
 Justice Enough  1956
 Emergency Exit  1957
 Put Out That Star (US Title: Into Thin Air)  1957
 James Knowland: Deceased  1958
 A Question of Time  1958
 ...Or Be He Dead  1959
 Stranglehold (US Title: Marked Man)  1959
 Requiem for Charles (US Title: The Late Unlamented)  1960
 The Seeds of Hate  1960
 Alibi  1961
 Confession  1961
 The Link  1962
 Of Unsound Mind  1962
 Vendetta  1963
 Flashback  1964
 Safe Secret  1964
 Post Mortem  1965
 Suicide Clause  1966
 The Condemned  1967
 Murder by Proxy  1967
 A Slightly Bitter Taste  1968
 Death Trap  1970
 Remote Control  1970
 Most Deadly Hate  1971
 The Quiet Woman  1971
 Naked to the Grave  1972
 Candles for the Dead  1973
 Too Late for Tears  1973
 The Motive  1974
 False Evidence  1976
 A Grave for Two  1977
 Life Cycle  1978

References

British crime writers
1979 deaths
1908 births